The Heaton Park Tramway is a heritage tramway that operates within Heaton Park, a large municipal park in the English city of Manchester. It is operated by the Manchester Transport Museum Society, a registered charity.

In normal times, the tramway operates on Sunday afternoons between March and mid-November and on Saturday afternoons between May and mid-September. Operation may be suspended whilst major events are being held in the park, and was temporarily suspended due to the COVID-19 pandemic although the tramway has now reopened.

History 
Heaton Park was originally the private landscape park surrounding Heaton Hall, but was sold to Manchester City Council in 1902 for use as a municipal park. Shortly after the park was bought by the council, a branch of Manchester Corporation Tramways was built  into the park from the existing tramway on Middleton Road. A large waiting shelter was constructed at the end of this branch, and the first tram arrived on 31 May 1903. By 1934 buses were taking over from trams and the stub tramway into the park was disconnected from the main system and covered in tarmac for use by buses.

The Manchester Transport Museum Society (MTMS) was founded as a registered charity in the early 1960s, with the aim of the preservation of documents and artifacts relating to public transport in the Manchester region. An early project of the society was the restoration of Manchester Corporation Tramways 765, with aspirations to operate the car in Manchester, and identified Heaton Park as a possible site.

In the 1970s the society approached the city council with this idea. The initial plan, to construct a tramway from Grand Lodge to Heaton Hall, was considered too expensive, as it would require remedial works to carry it across the railway tunnel. A new scheme was proposed to open up the old Manchester Corporation Tramways spur from Middleton Road to the old tram shelter. The original track was buried under a layer of tarmac which was cleared and the tram shelter restored and modified to form a depot and museum. Work was completed in 1979 and the Heaton Park Tramway was officially opened on 28 March 1980.

Since 1980, the museum tramway has been extended further into the park on three occasions, using track salvaged from elsewhere, and is now 0.52 miles long. The most recent extension was in 2011 and reaches the boathouse and lake. A new tram depot has been constructed at this terminus. Additionally, major restoration of the original depot and museum complex was completed in 2007.

Tramcars

Permanent collection 
The following trams form the permanent collection of the Heaton Park Tramway:

Other visitors 
Trams that have visited the line include:
 Blackpool & Fleetwood No. 40 single-decker built in 1914.
 Blackpool No. 225 Boat open-decker built in 1934.
 Oporto No. 196 single-decker built in 1935.
 Marton Box No. 31 open-topper built in 1901. (The first Double Decker to run at the park since 1925).
 Blackpool No. 706 Balloon open-topper built in 1934.

Projects 
Overhauls to Stockport 5 are now complete,   Vanguard 619 is now  the main focus of priority for the tramway. A funding appeal will soon start for extension of the Lakeside depot in order to provide space for the T68 being preserved to move to the tramway. Future projects include the restoration of Manchester Corporation Tramways open top tram 173 built in 1901, Blackpool Balloon 702, Oldham 43 built in 1902 and the Blackpool railgrinder No. 752. Plans exist for a further extension of the tramway towards Heaton Park Metrolink stop.

References

External links
 Heaton Park Tramway - official site
 

Heritage streetcar systems
Museums in Manchester
Railway lines opened in 1903
Railway lines closed in 1934
Tram transport in England
Tramways with double-decker trams
Tram transport in Greater Manchester
Transport in Manchester
Transport museums in England